Praproše (in some sources also Praproče) is a settlement in the Municipality of Radovljica in the Upper Carniola region of Slovenia.

References

External links
Praproše at Geopedia

Populated places in the Municipality of Radovljica